Domonique Simone (born June 18, 1971, in Valdosta, Georgia) is an African-American adult actress.

At the age of 17, Simone won a scholarship to the Fashion Institute of Design and Merchandising. At the age of 18, in 1989, she answered an ad for figure modeling and soon found herself shooting for pornographic magazines like Hustler and Players.

Simone is noted for being one of the top black starlets in the business, starring in more than 200 movies during the 1990s. 
She had large breast implants partway through her career.  Her most recent film/video appearances were in My Baby Got Back 21 (2000) and Booty Talk 17 (2000), with Lexington Steele, her last film. As of 2006, she has retired from making movies, works as a loan officer, and raises her two children.

In 2007, Simone was inducted into the AVN Hall of Fame.

References

External links 
 
 
 

1971 births
African-American pornographic film actors
American pornographic film actresses
Living people
People from Valdosta, Georgia
Pornographic film actors from Georgia (U.S. state)
21st-century African-American people
21st-century African-American women
20th-century African-American people
20th-century African-American women